2021 cabinet reshuffle may refer to:

 2021 British cabinet reshuffle
 2021 British shadow cabinet reshuffle (disambiguation)
 May 2021 British shadow cabinet reshuffle
 November 2021 British shadow cabinet reshuffle
 2021 Canadian cabinet reshuffle
 2021 Indian cabinet reshuffle